"Right Here" is a song by the Australian alternative band The Go-Betweens that was released as the lead single from their fifth album Tallulah. It was released as a 7" and 12" vinyl single on the Beggars Banquet label in the United Kingdom on 23 February 1987, with "When People Are Dead" as the B-side. In Australia it was released by True Tone Records, also as a 7" and 12" single. It was also released In Germany by Rebel Rec. (who issued a number of releases by Beggars Banquet for the German market) and in the United States as a promotional single by Big Time Records.

The song reached No. 82 on the UK Singles Charts but failed to chart elsewhere.

Details
"Right Here" is the first recording by The Go-Betweens that includes Amanda Brown.

In the liner notes for the band's compilation album, 1978-1990, McLennan writes that the song is about two friends of his, who worked in a funeral parlour and the constant exposure to the chemicals used in the preparation of the bodies turned them into addicts. Stating "I thought this would be a good subject to write about in a pop song." The song's title is derived from the chorus of Forster's song "You've Never Lived" (Spring Hill Fair 1984).

Forster had a different interpretation of McLennan's lyrics, describing it as, "a declaration of love. Amanda had been won and he was proud."

"Right Here", together with the second single, "Cut It Out", were both recorded with producer Craig Leon in London in late December 1986. Lindy Morrison said, "He was chosen to make this single accessible to the people, to get us to crawl out of our cult corner. No, of course it wasn't successful. It's never successful. I don't know why the record company bothers."

The B-Sides were then recorded in the second week of January 1987, with producer Richard Preston. Steve Miller (The Moodists) and Simon Fisher Turner (aka The King of Luxembourg) contributing guitar and backing vocals to "When People Are Dead". The lyrics were contributed by an Irish fan of the band, Marion Stout. The songs were then mixed on 11 January and cut the next day.

A promotional video was made for the single, directed by Nick Small. The video prominently features McLennan and Brown. The cover for the single was from a painting by McLennan.

Critical reception
Kristi Coulter at Allmusic believes that "it's one of the best love songs in the Go-Betweens' not-inconsiderable catalog of them" and "The melody is one of Grant McLennan's most memorable and the lyrics among his most heartfelt." She goes on to state that ""Right Here" is that rarest of things, a love song that promises rescue while also strongly hinting that its subject take some responsibility for herself."

In his review of Tallulah, at Allmusic, Thom Jurek describes the song, writing, "multi-tracked violins drive the center of the tune sprightly, in an off-rail, cut-time tempo. Robert Vickers' colorful keyboards and Morrison's programming are truly adornments, but McLennan's soulful yet philosophical vocal anchors the tune on bedrock and is supported by a beautiful chorus of backing vocals led by Brown."

Record Mirror said, "It borders precariously on the twee side, only just saving itself courtesy of Grant MacLennan's nasal passages, his vocals adding a certain sarcastic sneer." NME called it, "a shotgun wedding between Bunnymen and Tin Pan Alley which provides the firepower. Their best yet."

Track listing

Release history

Credits
The Go-Betweens
 Amanda Brown — violin, backing vocals
 Grant McLennan — vocals, guitar
 Lindy Morrison — drums
 Robert Forster — vocals, guitar
 Robert Vickers — bass

Additional musicians
 Steve Miller — guitar ("When People Are Dead")
 Simon Fisher Turner — backing vocals ("When People Are Dead")

Production
 Producer – Craig Leon ("Right Here")
 Assistant Producer – Cassell Webb ("Right Here")
 Producer — Richard Preston ("A Little Romance", Don't Call Me Gone", "When People Are Dead")

References

External links
 [ "Right Here"] @ AllMusic 
 "Right Here" @ MusicBrainz
 "Right Here" @ Discogs 
 Video

1987 singles
The Go-Betweens songs
1987 songs
Beggars Banquet Records singles
Songs written by Grant McLennan
Songs written by Robert Forster (musician)